SC Jetran Air SRL was a charter airline with its head office in Sector 1, Bucharest, Romania. Its main hub was at Henri Coandă International Airport in Bucharest.

History
JeTran Air as an airline was established in 2005, through a merger with the already existing company Jetran Asset Management, whose crews had been operating and maintaining MD80 Aircraft since 2003. In 2008, Jetran Air flew approximately 7,000 flight hours all over Europe and North Africa for various airline operators on Wet-Lease (ACMI) agreements. It operates scheduled passenger services to a small number of holiday destinations throughout Europe, Wet lease services to other airlines under ACMI contracts and Dry lease contracts since it has been reopened in 2019.

JetTrain Air since ceased operations again.

Destinations
Jetran Air was operating charter flights out of Henri Coandă International Airport, Oradea International Airport.

Fleet

The JeTran Air fleet consisted of the following registered aircraft (as of April 2019):

As of April 2019, the average age of the JeTran Air fleet was 30.7 years.

References

External links
Official website

Defunct airlines of Romania
Airlines established in 2005
Charter airlines
Companies based in Bucharest
Airlines disestablished in 2013
2013 disestablishments in Romania
Romanian companies established in 2005